Community care may refer to:

 Care in the Community 
 Community health centers in the United States
 Community Care, a magazine and website for the industry